Rudra Naga is a 1984 Indian Kannada-language film, directed by K. Mani Murugan and produced by Chandulal Jain and J. M. Purohith. The film stars Vishnuvardhan, Madhavi, B. Saroja Devi and Sudarshan. The film has musical score by M. Ranga Rao.

Cast

Vishnuvardhan
Madhavi
B. Saroja Devi
Sudarshan
Balakrishna
Brahmavar
B. Jayashree
Kunigal Nagabhushan
Master Naveen

Soundtrack
The music was composed by M. Ranga Rao.

References

External links
 
 

1984 films
1980s Kannada-language films
Films scored by M. Ranga Rao